The following is a list of Women's Professional Soccer stadiums including past, present, and future stadiums. Included are the stadium names, dates of occupation, occupant, date of opening and location:

Stadiums in bold type are those either currently in use by existing teams or the last stadiums used by defunct teams.

References

Women's Professional Soccer stadiums
Women's Professional Soccer stadiums
Soccer